James Dillon may refer to:
 James Dillon (officer) (c. 1600–after 1669), Irish Confederate officer
 James Dillon (bishop) (1738–1806), Roman Catholic Bishop of Kilmore, Ireland
 James Dillon (Irish senator) (died 1955), farmer who served in the Senate of the Irish Free State
 James Dillon (Fine Gael politician) (1902–1986), Irish politician and leader of the Fine Gael party
 James Dillon, 3rd Earl of Roscommon (c. 1605–1649), leader of the Royalist forces in Ireland
 James Dillon (composer) (born 1950), Scottish composer often regarded as belonging to the New Complexity school
 James Dillon (Australian politician) (1880–1949), Victorian State politician for the electoral district of Essendon
 J. J. Dillon (born 1942), retired American professional wrestler and manager
 James Dillon, 1st Earl of Roscommon (died 1642), Irish peer